Dutch Birding, originally subtitled Journal of the Dutch Birding Association, and currently subtitled International journal on Palaearctic birds, is an ornithological magazine published by the Amsterdam-based Dutch Birding Association. It was established in 1979 and its editor-in-chief is Arnoud van den Berg.

The magazine has English and Dutch language editions and covers morphology, systematics, occurrence, and distribution of birds in the Benelux, Europe, and elsewhere in the Palaearctic region. It also publishes contributions on birds in the Asian-Pacific region and other regions.

See also
Ardea – official publication of the Netherlands Ornithologists' Union
List of birds of the Netherlands
List of journals and magazines relating to birding and ornithology

References

External links
Dutch Birding Association website
Index of Dutch Birding articles since 2000

1979 establishments in the Netherlands
Dutch-language magazines
Journals and magazines relating to birding and ornithology
Magazines established in 1979
Magazines published in Amsterdam
Ornithology in the Netherlands
Science and technology magazines published in the Netherlands